Belloa chilensis is a species of perennial herb  belonging to the family Asteraceae that is endemic to parts of South America.

The range of the plant extends from Chile in the north down to Argentina and Chile in the south.

References

Gnaphalieae
Flora of Chile
Flora of Argentina
Plants described in 1848